Léopold Bernhard Bernstamm (20 April 1859 – 22 January 1939), also written as Léopold-Bernhard Bernstam, Léopold Bernard Bernstamm  or Leopold Adolfovich Bernstam, was a Baltic German sculptor active in France and Russia. He was one of the official sculptors of the Musée Grévin.

Biography

Bernstamm was born in Riga, now Latvia, where he entered the studio of Prof. David Jensen at age 13, and at 14 entered the Imperial Academy of Fine Arts of Saint Petersburg, where he won several awards. 

In the early 1880s he made about thirty busts of celebrated Russians including Fyodor Dostoyevsky (from a death mask, 1881), Denis Fonvizin, Aleksandr Ostrovsky (for the foyer of the Alexandrinsky Theater), and Mikhail Saltykov-Shchedrin (erected at the writer's grave in 1900). These busts established his reputation. He then spent 1884 in Rome and Florence, continuing his studies under a Professor Rivalti.

In 1885 he settled in Paris, often returning to Saint Petersburg. His sculptures of eminent Frenchmen soon made him famous, including portraits of François Coppée, Paul Déroulède, Gustave Flaubert, Ludovic Halévy, Ernest Renan, Victorien Sardou, Émile Zola, and Jean-Léon Gérôme. He also made portraits of Czar Nicholas II of Russia and members of the Imperial family (1896), Anton Rubinstein (1901), and Alexander Pushkin (1911).

His last work for Saint Petersburg was the bust of Czar Alexander III of Russia (erected in the Russian Museum garden, removed in 1918). All told, he sculpted approximately 300 portraits of Russian and European representatives of culture, science and politics, and sculpted some monuments. Bernstamm was made chevalier of the Légion d'honneur in 1891.

References

Further reading
 Serge Bernstamm, Leopold Bernstamm. Sa vie – son oeuvre, L. Lapina & Cie, Paris. 1913 (reprinted 2017)

External links

 Jewish Encyclopedia article
 Saint Petersburg Encyclopedia article
 Artnet entry

1859 births
1939 deaths
Artists from Riga
People from Kreis Riga
Latvian Jews
Latvian sculptors
20th-century Russian sculptors
20th-century Russian male artists
19th-century sculptors from the Russian Empire
19th-century male artists from the Russian Empire
Russian male sculptors
20th-century Latvian male artists
19th-century Latvian male artists